Sunnyland is the sixth studio album from American rock band Mayday Parade.

Background
In 2016, the group embarked on an anniversary tour for their Tales Told by Dead Friends (2006) EP, and later for their debut album A Lesson in Romantics (2007) in 2017.

Release
On April 11, 2018, the group announced they had signed to Rise Records. On May 3, Sunnyland was announced for release the following month. Alongside this, a music video was released for "Piece of Your Heart", directed by Miguel Barbosa. On May 15, a lyric video was released for "Never Sure". On May 31, a music video was released for "It's Hard to Be Religious When Certain People Are Never Incinerated by Bolts of Lightning", directed by Miguel Barbosa. Sunnyland was released on June 15, and was promoted with an appearance on the 2018 Warped Tour between June and August. An acoustic vide of "Piece of Your Heart" was released on September 25. In October and November, the group went on a headlining US tour, with support from This Wild Life, William Ryan Key and Oh, Weatherly.

In January 2019, the band performed at 8123 Fest. On April 18, a music video was released for "Never Sure". On May 29, a music video was released for "Looks Red, Tastes Blue", directed by Marlon Brandope. In July and August, the band performed at the Sad Summer Fest; in-between dates of the tour, the band held co-headlining shows with State Champs, with support from Mom Jeans and Just Friends. Later in August, they appeared at the Reading and Leeds Festivals.

Track listing

Personnel
Mayday Parade
 Jake Bundrick – drums, vocals
 Jeremy Lenzo – bass guitar, vocals
 Derek Sanders – lead vocals, keyboard
 Alex Garcia – lead guitar
 Brooks Betts – rhythm guitar
 Chris Lord-Alge - Mixing
 Ted Jensen - Mastering

Charts

References

2018 albums
Mayday Parade albums
Rise Records albums
Albums produced by Howard Benson
Albums produced by John Feldmann